The Borneo Evangelical Church or SIB is an evangelical Christian denomination in Malaysia. The church was organised in 1959 from the work of the Borneo Evangelical Mission with help from the Christian and Missionary Alliance Church in Indonesia 

Claiming more than 500,000 members, the SIB is the largest Protestant denomination in Malaysia having evolved from a small missionary presence among the Lun Bawang people of the Kelabit Highlands and the Iban people of Limbang to having congregations both in East Malaysia and West Malaysia today.

History

SIB Sabah and SIB Sarawak were founded by the Borneo Evangelical Mission (BEM) which itself had been established in Australia in 1928. Its pioneer missionaries came to Sarawak in late 1928 to evangelise the tribes of the heart of Borneo which until then had been unreached by the Christian faith. Aware that they would face competition in the cities, the BEM concentrated on interior rural areas and settled near the fringes of the Murut (Lun Bawang) area. In 1937, the work was extended to Sabah (then known as British North Borneo). From the start there were restrictions imposed by government officers, opposition by pagan tribal leaders, and problems of health and needs faced by the missionaries. From the small beginnings of several individual conversions, God brought about a people movement whereby whole tribes turned to Him. Miracles took place as God delivered many tribal people from the bondage of fear and oppression of paganism. The gospel began to spread from one tribe to another, village to village, downstream and upstream.

Sarawak's border areas were exposed to influences from American missionaries in Kalimantan (then known as Dutch Borneo), and most of the Lun Bawang groups became Christian through interaction with their kinfolk, indigenous converts on the other side of the international boundary.

The first missionaries to visit the Kelabit Highlands in the Sarawak interior arrived in 1939, but the internment of Europeans during World War II opened the door to indigenous leadership. When missionaries returned to the highlands in 1947 they found that the Murut church had survived and that most Kelabit people had accepted Christianity through the activities of indigenous converts, including a pastor from Timor, Guru Paul, also known as Nimang Tepun. Strongly committed to developing indigenous leadership, in 1948 the BEM established a bible school in the Sarawak town of Lawas for training teachers and deacons, and translating the bible into the Borneo languages was made a priority.

By 1958 an important symbolic step was made when it was decided to change the name of the mission to the Malay "Sidang Injil Borneo" (Borneo Evangelical Assembly). With the emphasis on training married couples to extend mission work and Kelabit out-migration to the oil-fields of Miri and elsewhere in search of employment and education, the SIB spread through Sarawak. Although there was a strong Chinese component in the urban areas, most SIB members were tribal peoples. Local leadership played an important role in the conversion process; in later years, for example, Amin Gomboting, a forest ranger who was stationed in various places in Sabah, established a SIB church wherever he went.

BEM had always been a mission with a strong emphasis of building an indigenous church. In 1950, a 15-year policy had been adopted to work toward a church in Borneo which would be sufficiently grounded and instructed to be able to take over the responsibility of Christian witness and evangelism. Translation of the Bible into the native languages a priority in this work. A biennial conference was carried out to elect local leaders for the Combined Executive Council of Sabah and Sarawak. This consisted of the Chairman, the Deputy Chairman, Secretary, Treasurer, and representatives from the districts and from BEM. In line with the emphasis of the 'Twin Primary Tasks' of BEM, SIB seeks to be significantly involved in evangelism and to build up churches through Bible teaching and leadership training. The SIB presently has five Bible schools in Sarawak, including the Malaysian Evangelical College (formerly Miri Bible College) and one Bible school in Sabah. BEM, which merged with the Overseas Missionary Fellowship (OMF) in 1974, continues to provide advice and indirect assistance, particularly in areas where the local leadership is unprepared. (See Drunk before Dawn by Shirley Lees, OMF, 1979.)

SIB Sabah was formed as a separate body from SIB Sarawak in 1976 in response to political circumstances.

In the early 1970s, renewal and revival continued and the gospel of Christ continued to spread among the interior people. Many young people went to towns from rural Christian backgrounds either for study or in search of jobs and this migration opened opportunities to SIB to build new churches in town areas.

Supported by teaching institutions and ongoing church-planting, SIB membership, reckoned at around 1000 in 1962, rose to 75,000 in 1993, and some interior churches can now accommodate as many as 3000 worshippers. The SIB is also well established in urban centres, notably Lawas, Limbang, Miri, Kuching, Sandakan, and Kota Kinabalu where many interior people have migrated in search of work.

In the early 1990s, Pastor Richard Samporoh and late wife, Pastor Stemmah Sariau, started a SIB Ministry in their house after noting the increasing number of Sabah & Sarawak migrating to Peninsula Malaysia either for study or seeking employment. However, for many years, the majority of the member were the natives from Borneo who pursue higher education in local and private universities in Klang Valley. In 1993, the student ministry began to receive more students from Borneo which led to the formation of the first SIB (BM) church in the Peninsula known as SIB Damansara Utama (the church has been renamed to SIB Petaling Jaya in 1997).  The following year SIB Kepong (English) began their first service. Over the years, the church began to plant new churches in various locations in Klang Valley and OA. During these years, the planted SIB churches are supervised mainly under the SIB Sabah umbrella before separated and become independent in the administration in the year 2005 and later known as SIB Semenanjung.

The church's leadership was handed over to a married couple, Dr. Chew Weng Chee, an obstetrician-gynecologist from Tung Shin Hospital, and Lew Lee Choo, another doctor who studied in the UK. The English congregation grew from 15 people in 1994 to around 130 in 1998. In 2006, SIBKL rented out three floors in a downtown building called Bangunan Yin (look up the spiritual concept of Yin Yang), and currently, three worship services are held each Sunday to serve over 1500 people. There are now 31 congregations in West Malaysia (29 Malaysian-speaking, 1 Chinese and 1 English), including missions among Christian Orang Asli in Jerantut.

In 2011 there are 600 churches with 150 000 memberships and 450 pastors in Sarawak. In 2014 there are more than 500 churches with 150 0000 memberships in Sabah. In 2021 there more than 800 churches in Sarawak.

SIB is also now expanding to Thailand, Vietnam, Cambodia, Papua New Guinea, and the southern Philippines, where local churches are tapping its experience in working with tribal peoples.

Beliefs and practices

Mission statement
Sidang Injil Borneo Church exists to passionately affect our world with the life-changing Gospel of Jesus Christ. We do this by worshiping God, proclaiming His Word, and equipping and deploying into ministry devoted followers of Jesus Christ.

Statement of faith
Sidang Injil Borneo Church accepts the Holy Scriptures as the revealed will of God, the all-sufficient rule of faith and practice, and, for the purpose of maintaining general unity, adopts these Statements of Fundamental Truths and Doctrine. The fundamental teachings of this Church are reflected in the following clear statements of faith.
 We believe in the inspiration of the Scriptures as originally given. The Scriptures are infallible, inerrant, and the sole and final authority for all matters of faith and conduct (II Timothy 3:16, I Corinthians 2:13).
 We believe in the eternal God the Father, the Creator of the universe (Deuteronomy 6:4).
 We believe in the creation, test, and fall of man as recorded in Genesis, his total spiritual depravity and inability to attain divine righteousness (Romans 3:10, 23 and 5:12, 18).
 We believe in the Lord Jesus Christ, the Son of God, Messiah of Israel, the Savior of man, conceived of the Holy Spirit, and born of the virgin Mary (Luke 1:26-28, John 1:14-18, Isaiah 7:14, 9:6-7).
 We believe the Messiah died and became the sacrificed Lamb for our sins, was buried and rose again on the third day and personally appeared to His disciples (Luke 24:1-53, Romans 4:25, I Corinthians 15:8).
 We believe in the bodily ascension of Jesus to Heaven, His exaltation, and personal, literal, and bodily coming again in the second time for His people (John 14:2-3, I Thessalonians 4:13-18, II Thessalonians 1:7, Revelation 19:11-16).
 We believe in the salvation of sinners by grace, through repentance and faith in the perfect and sufficient work of the Cross of Calvary by which we obtain remission of sins (Ephesians 2:8-9, Hebrews 9:12, Romans 5:11).
 We believe in the necessity of water baptism by immersion in the name of the eternal God to fulfill the command of the Lord Jesus the Messiah (Matthew 28:19, Acts 2:34-38, and 19:1-6, Acts 22:16).
 We believe in the operation of the gifts of the Holy Spirit (Galatians 5:22-23, I Corinthians 12, Romans 12, Ephesians 4).
 We believe in the Spirit-filled life, a life of separation from the world and perfecting of holiness in the fear of God as expressing the true Messianic faith (Ephesians 5:18, II Corinthians 6:14, 7:1).
 We believe in the reality and personality of the devil and eternal judgment in the lake of fire prepared for the devil, his angels and those who follow him (Matthew 25:41, Revelation 20:1-10).
 We believe in eternal life for believers (John 3:16, 5:24) and eternal punishment for the unbelievers (Mark 9:43-48, II Thessalonians 1:9, Revelation 20:10, 15).
 We believe in the reality of one new man made up of Jews and Gentiles (Ephesians 2). There is one universal Body of Messiah, made up of genuine believers, but this one universal Body is also composed of many local fellowships in given localities. These fellowships are under the sovereign headship of the Lord Jesus the Messiah, exercising autonomous government under Him, administering all its local affairs, and ministry, as well as the propagation of the Gospel (Acts 15:22, Matthew 16:18, 18:15-20).
 We believe that government is ordained of God, and powers that be are ordained ministers of God to us for good. To resist the powers and ordinances is to resist the ordinance of God. We are subject not only for wrath sake, but for conscience sake, rendering to all their dues, custom to whom custom, fear to whom fear, honour to whom honour. We declare our loyalty to our government and its leaders and will assist in every way possible consistent with our faith in the Scriptures as Christian citizens (Romans 13).

Structure and organisation

The SIB is a registered church. The SIB has been registered with the governments of Sabah and Sarawak. Its Constitution was officially recognised by its governing body in 1961.

The SIB is a multiracial church. Over 15 local groups are represented. Services are held in Malay, English, Chinese and district languages including Iban, Bidayuh, Kadazan/Dusun, Kayan, Kelabit, Kenyah, Lun Bawang, Penan, Punan, Tagal, Orang Asli, and several others. It is an urban and rural church that was originally developed mainly in the interior places of Sabah and Sarawak. In recent years churches have been established in the main towns, e.g., Kota Kinabalu, Kuching, Miri, and Sibu as well as several other centres.

The SIB is a growing church. Formerly limited to certain parts of the two states, SIB members and churches are now distributed throughout Sabah, Sarawak, and West Malaysia. SIB is large: The SIB consists of 221 churches in Sabah with a membership of 34,260 and 219 churches in Sarawak with a membership of 59,674. Each church has its own elected leaders. There are only 76 full-time pastors in Sabah but in Sarawak there are 185 pastors. (Statistics are as of 1982.)

The SIB have been independent from its inception as an organisation in 1959. It financially supports its own pastors and workers. It also trains its own workers through its own training program. There are 6 Bible schools associated with the SIB in Sarawak and Sabah.

See also
 Christianity in Malaysia
 Status of religious freedom in Malaysia

Bibliography
 Bray, Jenny, Longhouse of faith, Borneo Evangelical Mission, 1971.
 Bray, Jenny, Longhouse of fear, Borneo Evangelical Mission.
 Cole, R Alan. Emerging pattern. CIM work in the Diocese of Singapore and Malaya, London, China Inland Mission / Overseas Missionary Fellowship, 1961, 48pp.
 Day, Phyllis. Sold twice. the story of a girl in West Malaysia. Original story by Norah Rowe; illustrations by Nancy Harding, OMF, London, 1968, 31pp. Paper. The true story of the conversion of a girl sold as an infant and later bought back by her mother.
 Hunt, Gillian. All the pieces fit, OMF, Singapore, 1987, pp. 28–157.
 Lees, Shirley. Drunk before dawn, OMF, 1979. Story of the Borneo Evangelical Mission now part of the Overseas Missionary Fellowship. 
 Lees, Shirley P. Jungle Fire, Oliphants, 1964, 94pp. Spread of Christianity among Borneo tribal groups in the 1950s.
 Lees, Shirley, and Bill. Is it sacrifice? OMF/IVP/STL, 1987, 192pp. Experiences with the Tagal people in Sabah and other work of the BEM/OMF in East Malaysia. 
 Nightingale, Ken. One way through the jungle, OMF/BEM, 1970.
 Newton, Brian William. A new dawn over Sarawak: the church and its mission in Sarawak, East Malaysia, MA thesis, Fuller Theological Seminary, 1988, 198pp.
 Peterson, Robert. Roaring Lion. Spiritism in Borneo challenged by the power of Christ, Overseas Missionary Fellowship, 1968, 1970.
 Rusha, Gladys. Truth to tell in Borneo, 1969, Oliphants.
 Southwell, C Hudson, Uncharted Waters, 1999, Astana Publishing.

References

Further reading
 The Borneo Evangelical Mission (BEM) and the Sidang Injil Borneo (SIB), 1928 - 1979: A Study of the Planting and Development of an Indigenous Church; Tan, Jin Huat; University of Wales; 2008
 Drunk Before Dawn; Shirley Lees, OMF Books, Kent, TN; 1979
 Mabuk Sebelum Fajar Menyinsing; Shirley Lees; transl.: Evelyn Hwee Yong, Tan; Sword Publishing House, Malaysia; 2009
 The Bario Revival; Bulan, Solomon & Lillian Bulan-Dorai; Home Matters Network, Malaysia; 2004
 ASANG; The story of Trevor White and the Dusuns of Sabah, written by Peter Elliott Australia, Published by Delia Wilson Cleveland Qld 4163 Australia, 1997
 Sejarah Gereja Sidang Injil Borneo; Richard Samporoh, Nipuhawang Publishing 1999

External links
 Sidang Injil Borneo Life, Kuala Lumpur
 Sidang Injil Borneo Life, Tronoh
 Sidang Injil Borneo Life, Lumut
 Sidang Injil Borneo Kuala Lumpur
 Sidang Injil Borneo Likas
 Sidang Injil Borneo Skyline
 Sidang Injil Borneo Bukit Kanada
 Sidang Injil Borneo Olive Garden
 Sidang Injil Borneo Grace
 Sidang Injil Borneo New Life
 Sidang Injil Borneo Petaling Jaya 
 Sidang Injil Borneo Papar Town Centre 
 Cornerstone Resources Berhad
 Malaysian Christian news Website
 National Evangelical Christian Fellowship

Protestantism in Malaysia
Christian organizations established in 1959
Christian missionary societies
Evangelical denominations in Asia